The Assalam Mosque is a mosque located in Nantes, France. Construction on the mosque began in 2009 and was completed in 2012. It is the largest mosque in its region in France.

Funding 
The construction of the Assalam Mosque was largely funded by wealthy Qatari Bader Abdullah Al-Darwish, the chairman of Darwish Holding, who donated €4.4 million to complete the building. Bader Abdullah Al-Darwish is also a member of the Board and the Executive Committee of Qatar National Bank. The cultural center connected to the mosque, Al Darwish Abdullah Cultural Center, is named after the wealthy donor. Other funding came from France's Muslim community.

Organization 
The mosque is managed by the Union des Organisations Islamiques de France (UOIF) (English: Union of Islamic Organisations of France), an umbrella organization that represents about 250 Muslim organizations in France.

Qatar has been heavily involved in investments for mosques and cultural centers managed by the UOIF, including with the Assalam Mosque. This is one of many mosques throughout Europe whose construction was funded by Qatar. A 1905 law in France enforcing the separation of church and state has led to funding issues for the construction of places of worship in France, leading wealthy donors, such as the Qataris, to step in and finance this construction.

Construction 
Prior to the construction of Assalam mosque, a small church was given to the UOIF for the purpose of Muslim worship. After several years, this space was no longer large enough for the number of Muslims seeking a worship space in Nantes so a larger area of city land was made available for the construction of a larger mosque.

The building consists of two separate buildings, the Assalam mosque and the Al Darwish Abdullah Cultural Center. The buildings are connected by a gallery and have a patio with fountains between them.

The prayer room can accommodate up to 1,500 people and has a mihrab which indicates the qibla (direction) of Mecca. The building features soft natural light to create a tranquil space for worshipers. The mosque's minaret is 17 meters tall and the dome is 14 meters tall.

Controversy 
Some controversy arose in regards to the construction of the mosque as some believed that the mosque was replacing a church in Nantes. This led to backlash and debate about whether the mosque was actually replacing Saint-Christophe chapel.

See also
  List of mosques in the Americas
  Lists of mosques

References

2012 establishments in France
Buildings and structures in Nantes
Mosques completed in 2012
Mosques in France
Sunni Islam in Europe
Sunni mosques